The following is a list of articles on municipal elections in the City of Hamilton, Ontario, Canada

City of Hamilton - pre-amalgamation
1969 Hamilton, Ontario municipal election
1972 Hamilton, Ontario municipal election
1974 Hamilton, Ontario municipal election
1976 Hamilton, Ontario municipal election
1978 Hamilton, Ontario municipal election
1980 Hamilton, Ontario municipal election
1982 Hamilton, Ontario municipal election
1985 Hamilton, Ontario municipal election
1988 Hamilton, Ontario municipal election
1991 Hamilton, Ontario municipal election
1994 Hamilton, Ontario municipal election

New City of Hamilton - post-amalgamation
 1997 Hamilton, Ontario municipal election
 2000 Hamilton, Ontario municipal election
 2003 Hamilton, Ontario municipal election
 2006 Hamilton, Ontario municipal election
 2010 Hamilton, Ontario municipal election
 2014 Hamilton, Ontario municipal election
 2018 Hamilton, Ontario municipal election

Elections, Municipal, Hamilton